Michael Vincent Band is a New England-based blues and rock band led by guitarist Michael Vincent. The regular lineup includes bass guitarist Dan Mack and drummer Dan Hewitt.

In 2013, the Michael Vincent Band released their debut album, Putting the Word in the Streets.

The band gained notoriety for their young age and choice of musical style. In 2008 they played alongside Jack Bruce of Cream, Eric Burdon and The Animals, and Joey Molland of Badfinger. On January 12, 2013, they shared the bill with Johnny Winter at the Flying Monkey Performance Center in Plymouth, New Hampshire. They have been a featured band at Morgan Freeman's Ground Zero Club in Clarksdale, Mississippi, played alongside Buddy Guy at his Legends Club in Chicago, and have worked with ZZ Top Fandango! engineer Terry Kane.

Discography

"Mama's Rockin'" 
Released in 2018
"Nanticoke"
"Mama's Rockin'"
"Turned Around and Left"
"Make Up My Mind"
"Hard Times"
"Let Me Go"
"Brothers"

"Puttin' the Word in the Streets" 
Released in 2013
"Trailer Park Boogie"
"Old Brown Shoe"
"Won't Look at Me the Same"
"The Midst"
"Let Me Go"
"Gator's Lament"
"Here Today, There Tomorrow"
"Street Corner Talkin'"
'I Need You"
"Mona"

"Doubleshot" 
Released in 2012
"Delta Travellin'"
"See You Another Day" (w/ Seamus Kirwan on Clavinet)
"I'm All Alone"
"Crazy Mama"
"You Won't Look at Me the Same"
"Packing Up"
"I Get So Weary" (w/ Seamus Kirwan on Grand Piano)
"Doubleshot"
"Sleepy Time Time"
"Gator's Lament" (w/ Seamus Kirwan on Hammond B3)
"In Despair"
"Parchmans Farm"
"Like a Rolling Stone" (w/ Seamus Kirwan on Hammond B3)

References

External links 
 
 Michael Vincent Band official Facebook page

Rock music groups from New Hampshire
People from Gilford, New Hampshire